Alfred Lee Oglesby (January 27, 1967September 26, 2009) was a professional American football defensive end and defensive tackle in the National Football League. He played for the Miami Dolphins (1990–1992), the Green Bay Packers (1992), the New York Jets (1993–1995), and the Cincinnati Bengals (1995).

Early life and football career 
Oglesby was born in Texas on January 27, 1967. Growing up in Weimar, Texas, he lettered in three sports eventually leading to a scholarship from the University of Houston. After multiple all-American seasons in Houston, Oglesgy was drafted to the 1990 Miami dolphins in the third round. He would go on to play six seasons in the NFL before his career was unexpectedly cut short: he suffered a knee injury during a 1991 game against the Chicago Bears and never returned to the field.

Later life
After football, Oglesby entered the world of finance where he was the CEO of ALO Investments. 

On September 26, 2009, Oglesby was pronounced dead.

See also

1989 Houston Cougars football team

External links
Former UH Star Oglesby Passes Away

1967 births
2009 deaths
People from Weimar, Texas
Players of American football from Texas
American football defensive ends
American football defensive tackles
Houston Cougars football players
Miami Dolphins players
Green Bay Packers players
New York Jets players
Cincinnati Bengals players